is a Japanese anime television series by Shirogumi. It is a spin-off of Kiyohiko Azuma's Yotsuba&! manga, based on the cat versions of the Danbo characters within the series. It began airing on September 27, 2016, on NHK-E.

Figures 
The original Nyanbo or Nyanboard 60mm figures were created by Sentinel in December 2015. The figure maker Kotobukiya released smaller 35mm versions called  in December 2016, and larger 90mm versions called Nyanboard [mini] in January 2017.

Characters

Main Characters

A tiger-stripped Nyanbo and the leader of the group. He is the most eager to gather the UFO pieces and tries his best to motivate the others to help with it, with mixed results.

Another tiger-stripped Nyanbo and Tora's younger sister, she is the only child in the group.

A white-colored Nyanbo who is infatuated with Tora, and is always trying to win his affection.

A black-colored Nyanbo who rarely speaks, but is kind and dependable. He is usually seen playing with Kotora. 

A calico cat-colored, carefree Nyanbo who usually gets himself and the other Nyanbos in trouble.

Nyanbo Angels

A member of the idol band Nyanbo Angels. She is infatuated with Tora and often competes with Shiro to win him over.

A member of the idol band Nyanbo Angels. She has the habit of going berserk when she loses her glasses.

Wild Black

The leader of Wild Black, a gang who loves the color black. He also is in love with Kuro, despite knowing the fact that Kuro is a boy. Kuro however, ignores his advances completely.

A member of Wild Black.

A member of Wild Black.

Mecha Nyanbos

The leader of the Mecha Nyanbo who is seeking the UFO pieces to assemble Omega, his fighting robot, usually leading him to conflict with Tora and the others.

One of the Mecha Nyanbo who helps Alpha with finding UFO pieces. He, unlike the rest of the Mecha Nyanbo, are friendly towards the Nyanbo.

Other Characters
Narrator

Media

Anime
The anime began airing on September 27, 2016, on NHK-E as part of its "mini-anime" program.

The series is simulcast on Crunchyroll outside of Asia, who are also the master licensee for the series. Discotek Media will release the series on home video.

Episode list

Production
The series was announced in February 2016 by the NHK after as a "mini anime" corner program for NHK-E. The series is produced by Shirogumi. The anime series does not adapt any part of the original Yotsuba&! manga series, although its main character Yotsuba Koiwai has a speechless cameo on the credits in every episode.

See also
 Danbo (character)

References

External links
 

2016 anime television series debuts
Discotek Media
Japanese children's animated comedy television series
Crunchyroll anime
NHK original programming
Shirogumi
Yotsuba&!